Women's vault competition at the 2008 Summer Olympics was held on August 17 at the Beijing National Indoor Stadium.

The eight competitors (with a maximum of two per nation) with the highest scores in qualifying proceeded to the women's vault finals. There, each gymnast performed two vaults; the scores from the final round (ignoring qualification) determining the final ranking.

Disputes 

There was a major controversy concerning the Russian gymnast Anna Pavlova. Her first vault scored a 15.625, placing her in medal contention.  On her second vault, she thought she had received confirmation from the judges and, as a result, began before the green light and received a 0.

Final

*Pavlova had the second vault disqualified due to a false start.

Qualified competitors

References
Vault final results
Vault qualification results

NYT Report

Gymnastics at the 2008 Summer Olympics
2008
2008 in women's gymnastics
Women's events at the 2008 Summer Olympics